Acantholimon (prickly thrift) is a genus of flowering plants in the family Plumbaginaceae. They are native to Asia.

The genus has 314 accepted species, according to Plants of the World Online.

Species

The American based GRIN only lists 22 species; Acantholimon alberti, Acantholimon androsaceum, Acantholimon armenum, Acantholimon aulieatense, Acantholimon avenaceum, Acantholimon caryophyllaceum, Acantholimon echinus, Acantholimon glumaceum, Acantholimon hohenackeri, Acantholimon kotschyi, Acantholimon kotschyi subsp. kotschyi, Acantholimon kotschyi subsp. laxispicatum, Acantholimon litvinovii, Acantholimon lycaonicum, Acantholimon olivieri, Acantholimon puberulum, Acantholimon saxifragiforme, Acantholimon tenuiflorum, Acantholimon trojanum, Acantholimon ulicinum and Acantholimon venustum.

References 

Acantholimon